The Bakossi Mountains are a mountain range that forms part of the Cameroon line of active and extinct volcanoes in western Cameroon, covering about .
The mountains lie in the regions of Littoral and the Southwest.
They contain a large area of cloud forest, and have considerable ecological interest. The mountains are home to the Bakossi people.

The climate is tropical, with rainfall throughout the year. The drier season lasts from November to March, with cold nights and hot days. The rainy season starts in April and peaks between late August and the end of October. The soil is fertile, supporting coffee and cocoa as cash crops.

The mountains hold the Bakossi Forest Reserve, a  reserve created in 1956. 
In 2000, the main section of the reserve was designated a protection forest. All logging was banned and Kupe became a "strict nature reserve". The local Bakossi people participated in delineating the boundaries.
The Forest Reserve in turn contains the Bakossi National Park, created by a decree in early 2008.

References

Volcanoes of Cameroon
Mountain ranges of Cameroon
Littoral Region (Cameroon)
Southwest Region (Cameroon)
Cameroonian Highlands forests